Stygocarididae is a family of crustaceans belonging to the order Anaspidacea.

Genera:
 Oncostygocaris Schminke, 1980
 Parastygocaris Noodt, 1963
 Stygocarella Schminke, 1980
 Stygocaris Noodt, 1963

References

Crustaceans